Joshua ben Israel Benveniste (c. 1590 – c. 1668) was the brother of Chaim Benveniste, and a disciple of Joseph Trani. He was a physician and rabbi at Constantinople in 1660.

Benveniste prepared (1) Mishmeret Ha-Miẓvot (Observance of the Commandments), a metrical version of the Azharot, with commentary; and (2) Lebush Malkut (Royal Garment), a hymn in the style of Gabirol's Royal Crown, of which medical science constitutes the foundation. Azulai claims to have seen both of these writings in manuscript at the house of a rabbi in Constantinople.

Works
He wrote the following works:
Abodah Tammah (Perfect Service), a commentary on the service for the Day of Atonement (ib. 1719-20)
Ozne Yehoshua (The Ears of Joshua), sermons for the Sabbath and special occasions (Constantinople, 1677)
Sedeh Yehoshua (Fields of Joshua), a commentary on several tractates of the Talmud Yerushalmi (ib. 1662, 1749)
Seder ha-Geṭ, on the formula for divorce, written at Brusa and published at Constantinople, 1719
Sha'ar Yehoshua (Gate of Joshua), Benveniste's collection of responsa, seems to have been destroyed by fire; with several of his responsa are included in the collections of Moses Benveniste and Joseph Trani. However, a manuscript of the author was found in the early 20th century and published in 1904 (Hustin).

References

Sources
Jewish Encyclopedia bibliography
David Conforte, Ḳore ha-Dorot, 51a;
Azulai, Shem ha-Gedolim, i.70.

External links
Ozne Yehoshua - scanned version in PDF format
Sedeh Yehoshua (1662 edition) - scanned version in PDF format
Sedeh Yehoshua (1749 edition) - scanned version in PDF format
Shaar Yehoshua - scanned version in PDF format

__notoc__

1590s births
1660s deaths
17th-century rabbis from the Ottoman Empire
Rabbis from Istanbul